Hypothenemus is a genus of oriental bark beetles in the family Curculionidae. There are more than 200 described species in Hypothenemus. They are common in tropical and subtropical areas worldwide, and found less often in temperate areas of eastern North America and eastern Asia. The small beetles are typically 0.6 mm to 2.2 mm in length, males smaller than females.

See also
 List of Hypothenemus species

References

External links

 

Scolytinae